Samuel Plummer may refer to:

 Samuel L. Plummer (1828–1897), member of the Wisconsin State Assembly
 Samuel F. Plummer (1853–?), member of the Wisconsin State Assembly